A bailie or baillie is a civic officer in the local government of Scotland. The position arose in the burghs, where bailies formerly held a post similar to that of an alderman or magistrate (see bailiff). Baillies appointed the high constables in Edinburgh, Leith and Perth. Modern bailies exist in Scottish local councils, with the position being a courtesy title and appointees often requested to provide support to the lord provost or provost - the ceremonial and civic head of the council - in their various engagements.

History
The name derives from Old French and used to be synonymous with provost, with several officials holding this role often at the appointment of the Church.

The jurisdiction of a bailie is called a bailiary (alt. bailiery).

The office of bailie was abolished in law in Scotland in 1975, and today the position of bailie is a courtesy title.

Use
 Aberdeen City Council - appoints five bailies.
 Dundee City Council - appoints five bailies. The position was reintroduced in 2003.
 Edinburgh City Council - appoints six bailies. The position was reintroduced in the 2000s following the title falling into disuse after the 1975 reform of local government.
 Glasgow City Council - appoints eighteen bailies.
 Perth and Kinross Council - appoints five bailies.
 Stirling Council - appoints four bailies 
 West Dunbartonshire Council - revived the title in 2017 to appoint to veteran councillor Denis Agnew.

Notable Scottish bailies

As a title
Alasdair MacMhaighstir Alasdair, Bailie of Canna
Mary Barbour, Glasgow Corporation's first woman Baillie (1924-1927)
Alexander Comyn, Earl of Buchan, Bailie of Inverie, Knoydart
Dr George Coull FRSE, Bailie of Edinburgh
Sir John Lauder, 1st Baronet, Bailie of Edinburgh
Sir James Steel, 1st Baronet (1829–1904), Bailie of Edinburgh from 1888-1900
Thomas Watt, Bailie to the Baron of Cartsburn, grandfather of James Watt
Bailie William Landale, winner of the silver cup at the first open championship held at St Andrews Old Course in 1754, see Timeline of golf history (1353-1850)
 "Baillie Vass" - the Aberdeen Evening Express accidentally used a picture of Sir Alec Douglas-Home over a caption referring to a baillie called Vass. Private Eye then affected to believe that Home was an imposter.

As a surname
Alexander Baillie - internationally recognised cellist, born 1956.
Chris Baillie - Scottish hurdler
Chris Baillie (politician) - New Zealand politician
David Baillie - Writer, born in West Lothian, known for comicbook work such as 2000 AD and Red Thorn.
Jackie Baillie - Member of the Scottish Parliament for Dumbarton.
Jim Baillie - Scottish footballer
Thomas Baillie - Royal Navy officer known for a celebrated libel case.
William Baillie - Irish print maker.
James Bailie - American real estate developer of Scottish descent.

Outside of government
Scottish barons often appointed a Bailie as their judicial officer.

See also
Burgess (title)
Deacon
Glasgow Bailie, a type of salted herring, which is also sometimes known as a "Glasgow Magistrate"
Bailie Nicol Jarvie, a brand of whisky named after a fictional character in Sir Walter Scott's novel Rob Roy

References

Scottish titles
Political office-holders in Scotland
Local government in Scotland